Katwa subdivision is an administrative subdivision of the Purba Bardhaman district in the state of West Bengal, India.

Overview

The Katwa subdivision extends from the Kanksa-Ketugram plain to the Bhagirathi basin. The Ajay flows through the subdivision and joins the Bhagirathi.

Subdivisions
Purba Bardhaman district is divided into the following administrative subdivisions:

Administrative units

Katwa subdivision has  3 police stations, 5 community development blocks, 5 panchayat samitis, 46 gram panchayats, 388 mouzas, 373 inhabited villages, 2 municipalities and 1 census town. The municipalities are at Katwa and Dainhat. The census town is: Panuhat. The subdivision has its headquarters at Katwa.

Demographics
As per the 2011 Census of India data Katwa subdivision, after bifurcation of Bardhaman district in 2017, had a total population of 963,022. There were 494,584 (51%) males and 468,538 (49%) females. Population below 6 years was 109,884.

As per the 2011 census data the total number of literates in Katwa subdivision, after bifurcation of Bardhaman district in 2017, was 598,581 (70.16% of the population over 6 years) out of which males numbered 331,107 (75.50% of the male population over 6 years) and females numbered 269,474 (65.00% of the female population over 6 years).

See also – List of West Bengal districts ranked by literacy rate

In the 2011 census Hindus numbered 666,379 and formed 69.20% of the population in Katwa subdivision. Muslims numbered 294,354 and formed 30.57% of the population. Christians numbered 1,001 and formed 0.10% of the population. Others numbered 1,288 and formed 0.13% of the population.

Police stations
Police stations in Katwa subdivision have the following features and jurisdiction:

Blocks
Community development blocks in Katwa subdivision are:

Gram panchayats
The subdivision contains 46 gram panchayats under 5 community development blocks:

 Katwa–I block consists of nine gram panchayats, viz. Alampur, Karajgram, Sargram, Gidhagram, Khajurdihi, Srikhanda, Goai, Koshigram and Sudpur.
 Katwa–II block consists of seven gram panchayats, viz. Agradwip, Jagadanandspur, Palsona, Sreebati, Gazipur, Karui and Singi.
 Ketugram–I block consists of eight gram panchayats, viz. Agardanga, Berugram, Murgram–Gopalpur, Pandugram, Ankhona, Jyandas–Kandara, Palita and Rajur.
 Ketugram–II block consists of seven gram panchayats, viz. Billeswar, Ketugram, Nabagram, Sitahati, Gangatikuri, Maugram and Nirol.
 Mongolkote block consists of 15 gram panchayats, viz. Bhalugram, Jhilu–II, Lakhuria, Paligram, Chanak, Kaichar–I, Majigram, Shimulia–I, Gotistha, Kaichar–II, Mongalkote, Shimulia–II, Jhilu–I, Kshirgram and Nigan.

Economy

Agriculture
In the erstwhile Bardhaman district agriculture was the pre-dominant economic activity and the main source of livelihood for the rural people.  The soil and climate favours the production of food grains. Cash crops are also grown. Irrigation facilities had contributed in a major way towards higher agricultural productivity. Amongst the districts of West Bengal, Bardhaman district had maximum irrigated land under cultivation. Given below is an overview of the agricultural production (all data in tonnes) for Bardhaman Sadar North subdivision, other subdivisions and the Purba Bardhaman district, after bifurcation of the erstwhile Bardhaman district, with data for the year 2013-14.

Education
Given in the table below (data in numbers) is a comprehensive picture of the education scenario in Purba Bardhaman district, after bifurcation of Bardhaman district in 2017, with data for the year 2013-14:

Note: Primary schools include junior basic schools; middle schools, high schools and higher secondary schools include madrasahs; technical schools include junior technical schools, junior government polytechnics, industrial technical institutes, industrial training centres, nursing training institutes etc.; technical and professional colleges include engineering colleges, medical colleges, para-medical institutes, management colleges, teachers training and nursing training colleges, law colleges, art colleges, music colleges etc. Special and non-formal education centres include sishu siksha kendras, madhyamik siksha kendras, centres of Rabindra mukta vidyalaya, recognised Sanskrit tols, institutions for the blind and other handicapped persons, Anganwadi centres, reformatory schools etc.

The following institutions are located in Katwa subdivision:
Katwa College at Katwa was established in 1948.
Kandra Radha Kanta Kundu Mahavidyalaya was established at Kandra in 2001.
Chandrapur College was established at Chandrapur in 1985.
Mangalkote Government College was established at Mongalkote in 2015.

Healthcare
The table below (all data in numbers) presents an overview of the medical facilities available and patients treated in the hospitals, health centres and sub-centres in 2014 in Purba Bardhaman district, after bifurcation of the erstwhile Bardhaman district in 2017, with data for the year 2013-14.

Medical facilities available in Katwa subdivision are as follows:

Hospitals: (Name, location, beds)
Katwa Subdivisional Hospital, Katwa, 250 beds
Indian Red Cross Society, Katwa, 13 beds
Rural Hospitals: (Name, CD block, location, beds)
Singot Rural Hospital, Mangalkote CD block, Singot, PO Mathrun, 50 beds
Ramjibanpur Rural Hospital, Ketugram I CD block, Ramjibanpur, PO Jnandas Kandra, 30 beds
Block Primary Health Centres: (Name, block, location, beds)
Srikhanda BPHC, Katwa I CD block, Srikhanda, 15 beds
Noapara BPHC, Katwa II CD block, Noapara, PO Dainhat, 15 beds
Ketugram BPHC, Ketugram II CD block, Ketugram, 15 beds
Mogalkote BPHC, Mongalkote CD block, Nutanhat, 15 beds
Primary Health Centres: (CD block-wise)(CD block, PHC location, beds)
Katwa I: Chandrapur (10), Kaithan (6), Sudpur (6)
Katwa II: Agradwip (10), Singhi (6)
Ketugram I: Ankhona (2), Pandugram, PO Khatundi (10)
Ketugram II: Sibloon (10), Sitahati (4)
Mongalkote: Chanakkasem, PO Kasem Nagar (6), Khirogram (2), Lakhoria (10), Nigon (6)

Electoral constituencies
Lok Sabha (parliamentary) and Vidhan Sabha (state assembly) constituencies in Katwa subdivision were as follows:

References

Subdivisions of West Bengal
Subdivisions in Purba Bardhaman district